Comentiolus (Komentiolos; died 602) was a prominent Eastern Roman (Byzantine) general at the close of the 6th century during the reign of Emperor Maurice. He played a major role in Maurice's Balkan campaigns, and fought also in the East against the Sassanid Persians. Comentiolus was ultimately executed in 602 after the Byzantine army rebelled against Maurice and Emperor Phocas usurped the throne.

Biography

Nothing is known of Comentiolus's early life, except that he hailed from Thrace. He first appears in 583, as an officer (scribon) in the Excubitores, the imperial bodyguard, when he accompanied a Byzantine embassy to Bayan I, the khagan of the Avars. According to the historian Theophylact Simocatta, he enraged the khagan with an outspoken statement, and was briefly imprisoned.

It is likely that the close trust he shared with Maurice dates from the latter's time as commander of the Excubitores, before his ascension to the throne. Throughout his career, Comentiolus would be loyal to Maurice, and the Emperor would watch over his protégé's career. The next year, after a truce with the Avars had been arranged, he was appointed in charge of a regiment (taxiarchia) operating against the Slavic tribes that raided Thrace and had penetrated as far as the Long Walls of Anastasius, Constantinople's outer defensive system. Comentiolus defeated them at the river Erginia, near the Long Walls. As a reward for this success, he was appointed magister militum praesentalis in 585.

On this occasion, or perhaps a bit later (possibly in 589), Comentiolus was raised to the supreme title of patricius. In the summer of 585, he defeated again a large force of Slavs, and in 586 he was placed in charge of the war against the Avars, after they broke the treaty. In 587, Comentiolus assembled a 10,000 strong army at Anchialus. He prepared an ambush for the Avar khagan in the Haemus mountains, but it failed.

By 589, Comentiolus appears to have served as magister militum in the province of Spania (southern Spain): an inscription bearing his name has been found in Carthago Nova, but it may have been erected by a namesake. At any rate, by the autumn of 589 he was back in the East, replacing Philippicus in command of the eastern army in the ongoing war against the Sassanid Persians. His army defeated the Persians at the Battle of Sisauranon in the same year and unsuccessfully tried to recapture Martyropolis. In the spring of 590, however, while at his headquarters at Hierapolis, he received an unexpected guest: the legitimate Persian king, Khosrau II, who had fled to Byzantine territory to seek support against the usurper Bahram VI Chobin. Emperor Maurice decided to support the exiled monarch, and assembled an army to restore Khosrau to his throne. Comentiolus was initially slated to lead this force, but after Khosrau complained of Comentiolus being disrespectful towards him, he was replaced as commander of the expedition by Narses. Comentiolus still took part in the subsequent campaign as commander of the army's right wing. The restored Persian king repaid Roman assistance with a treaty which put an end to the war that had lasted almost 20 years, and ceded back all cities lost in Mesopotamia, as well as most of Armenia, to the Romans.

This favourable peace meant that Byzantium's forces could now be concentrated against the Avar and Slav incursions in the Balkans. In 598, Comentiolus was sent back into action against the Avars, probably with the position of magister militum per Thracias. After a heavy defeat caused by his neglect to properly array his forces for battle, his army was scattered and he himself fled to Constantinople, where he faced charges of treason. These were dropped at the Emperor's request, and Comentiolus was reconfirmed as general for Thrace. His subsequent record is not very distinguished, but according to Michael Whitby this may be more due to the negative bias of Simocatta, the main primary source for the period, towards him and his co-general Peter, rather than because of inability or inaction on his part. At any rate, when the army rebelled against Maurice in 602, Comentiolus was entrusted with the defence of the Walls of Constantinople. When Phocas eventually took the city, he was one of the first adherents of the old regime to be executed.

References

Sources

6th-century births
6th-century Byzantine generals
7th-century Byzantine generals
602 deaths
7th-century executions by the Byzantine Empire
Avar–Byzantine wars
Generals of Maurice
Executed Byzantine people
Magistri militum
People of the Roman–Sasanian Wars